Prof. Rajat K Baisya is an Indian management professor, author, and researcher. He was formerly Professor & Dean of Dept of Management Education, IIT Delhi. He was awarded Canada Gairdner International Award for the year 1974. He was also awarded Dr J.S.Pruthi Award for the year 2001 for significant contribution to the food industry.

Academic Career

Prof Rajat Kanti Baisya obtained his B. Sc. (Honours in chemistry) degree from Calcutta University and thereafter got his B.Tech. , M.Tech , and Ph.D degrees in Engineering from Jadavpur University. He served in the same institute as CSIR , UGC and Ministry of Defence research scholar working on various projects in the areas of Biochemical and Food Engineering as well as Chemical Engineering.

Dr Rajat Baisya served as Dean of Dept of Management Education, IIT Delhi. He has written over 350 research articles and six books, besides supervising seven PhD thesis in the areas of supply chain management, marketing management, strategic management and international business. Prior to becoming Dean at IIT Delhi Dr Baisya was Professor at the Department of Food, Dairy and
Agriculture Engineering at Indian Institute of Technology, Kharagpur.

Corporate Career

He was President and CEO of the Emami Group of Companies from 1988 to 1994. For many years prior to that, he was the Global Senior Vice President, Business Development at Reckitt Benckiser Ltd. In addition, he has held senior management positions at companies such as Escorts Ltd, United Breweries Group, Unilever Group, and Parle-Bisleri Group.

Awards and honours

 Awarded Gairdner International Award for the year 1974.
 Awarded Dr J.S.Pruthi Award for the year 2001 for significant contribution to the food industry.
 Awarded National Institute of Management & Technology Commendation Award for the year 2002 for corporate Excellence & significant contribution in the areas of corporate turnaround strategies and change management.
 Dr Baisya is a Fellow of Institute of Engineers and Indian Institute of Chemical Engineers and Institute of Management Consultants. He also served as the Chairman of Institute of Management Consultants of India Delhi.
 Research Management Board of International Project Management Association (IPMA)
 Best Professor of Marketing Management Award from Bloomberg UTV

Books Authored

 Integrated Supply Chain and Logistics Management, Published by SAGE Publishing, 2020, 
 Branding in a Competitive Marketplace, Published by SAGE Publishing, 2013, 
 Winning Strategies for Business, Published by SAGE Publishing, 2014, 
 Aesthetics in Marketing, Published by SAGE Publishing, 2008, 
 Managing Start-Ups for Success: Entrepreneurship in Difficult Times, Published by Taylor & Francis, 2021,

Selected publications

 Charan, Parikshit, Ravi Shankar, and Rajat K. Baisya. "Analysis of interactions among the variables of supply chain performance measurement system implementation." Business Process Management Journal (2008).
 Chakrabarti, Somnath, and Rajat K. Baisya. "The influences of consumer innovativeness and consumer evaluation attributes in the purchase of fashionable ethnic wear in India." International Journal of Consumer Studies 33.6 (2009): 706-714.
 Baisya, Rajat K., and R. Sarkar. "Customer satisfaction in the service sector: a case study of the airline industry." Journal of Advances in Management Research (2004).
 Baisya, Rajat K., and Siddhartha Paul Tiwari. "E-governance Challenges and Strategies for Better-managed Projects." Emerging Technologies in E-Government (2008): 203-208.
 Baisya, Rajat Kanti, and Brane Semolic. "Evolving corporate education: Relevance of management education." Evolving corporate education strategies for developing countries: The role of universities. IGI Global, 2013. 39-55.

References

1942 births
Living people
Indian educators
Indian academic administrators
Heads of universities and colleges in India
Scholars from Delhi
21st-century Indian educators
Educationists from India
Academic staff of IIT Delhi
Bengali writers
Scholars from Kolkata
Jadavpur University alumni
Indian scholars
Indian scientific authors
University of Calcutta alumni
Academic staff of the University of Calcutta
West Bengal academics